Theodore "Ted" Cole (born April 6, 1912) and Ralph Roe (born February 5, 1906) took part in the second documented escape attempt from Alcatraz, in 1937. Although officials were quick to conclude they died in the attempt, their remains were never found and their fate remains unknown, making the incident the first to challenge Alcatraz's reputation as an "escape-proof" prison.

Imprisonment
Cole and Roe, both convicted bank robbers in Oklahoma, had been caught during earlier, independent escape attempts from that state's McAlester Prison. As escape risks, they were both incarcerated in high-security Leavenworth Prison, then transferred to higher-security Alcatraz in 1936. They were given jobs working in the prison's mat shop, a facility at the northernmost point of the island, where discarded automobile tires were cut up and converted into rubber mats for the U.S. Navy.

Roe was originally captured after a shootout with local police and FBI agents in Shawnee on December 30, 1933 which claimed the life of Roe's partner, Wilbur Underhill Jr.. Cole had been given a death sentence for his role in the robbery of a bottling works plant in Tulsa. However, that was reduced to 15 years on appeal.

Escape and disappearance
On December 16, 1937, a dense fog swept through the San Francisco Bay, impeding marine traffic and reducing visibility to near zero on Alcatraz Island. Cole and Roe were working in the mat shop. A routine headcount at 1:00 p.m. showed all prisoners accounted for. At the next count, at 1:30 p.m., the two men were gone. Once through the window, they slipped down to the gate of a high wire fence, concealed by the fog. With a wrench taken from the tire shop, they forced the gate lock and dropped twenty feet to a beach. Their trail vanished at that point.

An exhaustive search of the island revealed nothing; guards found only the abandoned wrench. An extensive, multi-day search ensued; portions of the island were flooded with tear gas in an attempt to flush out the escapees, with no result. Subsequent investigation revealed that Cole and Roe had prepared for the escape well in advance, using a hacksaw blade to weaken the window bars, and disguising the damage with a mixture of grease and shoe polish. At the beach, the men presumably entered the water, relying on floats improvised from tires or fuel canisters. There was no evidence to suggest they had constructed or launched a raft.

Prison officials concluded that Cole and Roe drowned shortly after their escape. The swift ebb tides at the time, estimated at 7–9 knots, would have swept even an expert swimmer out of the bay and into the Pacific Ocean. The fog was so thick that it would have made it almost impossible for outside confederates to pick them up by boat; the swimmers would not know if they were even swimming toward shore and they were likely swept out to sea. As it was late December, the water would have been very cold, ranging from 46 to 58 degrees Fahrenheit. Warden Johnston said "...The water is too cold, the tide running too high, and land is too far."

Despite their likely fate, police departments in the surrounding counties and the FBI followed up every tip and rumor. In the following days, months and years, there were various reports of sightings, but their validity is unknown. Two hitchhikers claimed to have seen Roe and Cole, and identified them to police by their photos. A 1941 San Francisco Chronicle report declared that the pair were living in South America, and a cab driver in Cole's hometown of Seminole, Oklahoma, told police he had been shot by men he recognized as the two escapees.

The Seminole Producer reported on June 7, 1939:

Oklahoma officers seemed intentionally to try to not identify the escapees as they continued their hijacking spree in the Seminole, Tecumseh and Shawnee, Oklahoma area. The Seminole Producer reported on June 24, 1939:

See also
 List of Alcatraz escape attempts
 List of fugitives from justice who disappeared
 Battle of Alcatraz
 June 1962 Alcatraz escape attempt

References

External sources

American escapees
American bank robbers
Criminal duos 
Escapes and escape attempts from Alcatraz
Escapees from United States federal government detention
Escapees from Oklahoma detention
Inmates of Alcatraz Federal Penitentiary
Prisoners and detainees of Oklahoma